Marija Leiko (14 August 1887 – 3 February 1938), also known as Marija Leyko, was a Latvian stage and silent film actress in Europe, especially popular in Latvia, Germany, and Russia.

Life and film career
Leiko conquered the German big screen first, starring in The Diamond Foundation (1917), Kain (1918), Ewiger Strom (1919), Die Frau im Käfig (1919) and Lola Montez (1919) as the dancer.

When the silent movie era ended Leiko retired from film acting. After the Nazi seizure of power in 1933, she returned to her native Latvia. In 1935 she visited the Soviet Union and stayed to join the company of the Latvian State Theatre in Moscow.

During the so-called "Latvian Operation" the theatre was shut down, and on 15 December 1937, Leiko was arrested on charges of belonging to a "Latvian nationalist conspiracy". On 3 February 1938 at the age of 50 she was shot and buried in a mass grave at the secret NKVD killing field at Butovo, near Moscow.

Maria Leiko was posthumously rehabilitated for the absence of a crime (corpus delicti) on May 12, 1958.

Memory 
On May 14, 2017 in Moscow on the wall of the house 9, building 3 at Obolensky lane  memorial sign Last Address of Maria Karlovna Leiko was posted.

Filmography
 Die Räuberbande (1928)
 The Green Alley (1928) playing Katherina Rezek
 At Ruedesheimer Castle There Is a Lime Tree (1928) playing Fritz's mother
 Aufstieg der kleinen Lilian (1925)
 Dr. Wislizenus (1924)
 The Treasure of Gesine Jacobsen (1923)
 Der Frauenkönig (1923)
 Die Schneiderkomteß (1922) playing the young Comtesse
 Sunken Worlds (1922)
 Children of Darkness (1921, 2 pats) playing  Maria Geone
 Die Frau von morgen (1921)
 The Rats (1921) playing  Pauline Piperkarcka
 The Fear of Women (1921) playing Reederstochter
 Am Webstuhl der Zeit (1921) (as Marija Leyko) playing  Ruth Einser, Hansen's assistant
 Das Opfer der Ellen Larsen  (1921)
 Brandherd (aka Verlogene Moral. English release title Torgus) (1921) playing Anna
 The Red Masquerade Ball (1921)
 Die Kwannon von Okadera (1920) playing Ingele von Geortz
 Eternal River (1920) playing  Marija
 Satanas (English release tite: Satan) (1920) playing Irene
 Die Frau im Käfig (1919)
 Freie Liebe (1919)
 Lola Montez (aka aka Am Hofe Ludwigs I. von Bayern) (1919) 
 Das Frühlingslied (1918)
 The Zaarden Brothers (1918)
 Die Diamantenstiftung (1917)

References

Sources
 Guna Zeltina, Anita Uzulniece  Language: Latvian Riga Liesma 155 pages (Illustrated) January 1989

External links
 Profile, kino-teatr.ru; accessed 14 August 2015.
 
 
 Marija Leiko filmography, mcomet.com; accessed 14 August 2015.
 Marija Leiko filmography , citwf.com; accessed 14 August 2015.

1887 births
1938 deaths
Actors from Riga
People from the Governorate of Livonia
Latvian stage actresses
Latvian silent film actresses
20th-century Latvian actresses
Latvian Operation of the NKVD
Great Purge victims from Latvia
Latvian people executed by the Soviet Union
Executed Latvian people
Soviet rehabilitations